SoftwareX is a biannual peer-reviewed open-access scientific journal covering scientific software. It is published by Elsevier, and its editors-in-chief are Kate Keahey, Randall Sobie, and David Wallom. The journal has an official GitHub repository where the software/code of all publications are archived. Articles are licensed under the Creative Commons Attribution License.

Abstracting and indexing
The journal is abstracted and indexed in the following bibliographic databases:
Emerging Sources Citation Index
Inspec
Scopus

References

External links

Creative Commons Attribution-licensed journals
Open access journals
Computer science journals
Elsevier academic journals
Online-only journals
Biannual journals
English-language journals
Publications established in 2015